Mateusz Bartczak (born 15 August 1979 in Legnica) is a retired Polish footballer who last played for Chojnowianka Chojnów.

Career

Club
He played in the 1999–2000 Championship winning season of Polonia Warsaw. He joined Polonia in season 1997–98, and made his debut in April 1998 against Katowice.

He joined Amica in 2002–03 and scored his debut, and so far only, goal at the club in the 2003–04 season.

In February 2011, he joined Cracovia on a six-month contract.

References

External links
 

1979 births
Living people
People from Legnica
Polish footballers
Association football midfielders
Ekstraklasa players
Polonia Warsaw players
Amica Wronki players
Zagłębie Lubin players
MKS Cracovia (football) players
KS Polkowice players
Sportspeople from Lower Silesian Voivodeship